Kum-Kum Bhavnani is an American university professor, filmmaker, and author. As of 2018, she is a Professor of Sociology and Distinguished Professor with Feminist Studies and Global and International Studies at the University of California, Santa Barbara, where she is Chair of the interdisciplinary program in Women, Culture, Development. She served as the Chair (2019–20) of the University of California Academic Senate.

In 2006, Bhavnani premiered first feature-length, award-winning documentary, The Shape of Water, based on her research in Senegal, Brazil, India, and Jerusalem. It is narrated by Susan Sarandon. Bhavnani premiered Nothing Like Chocolate in 2012, and Lutah in 2014. Bhavnani is the founder and director of Mirror Hammer Films.

Publications
Bhavnani's books and co-edited volumes include Talking Politics (Cambridge University Press), Feminism and ‘Race’ (Oxford University Press), Feminist Futures (Zed Press), and On the Edges of Development (Routledge). She was also the inaugural editor for Meridians: feminism, race, transnationalism from 2000–2002 at Smith College, Massachusetts.

Filmography

References

External links
 

University of California, Santa Barbara faculty
American documentary film directors
Year of birth missing (living people)
Living people
American sociologists
American women sociologists
American women documentary filmmakers
21st-century American women